Weird but True! is an American educational children's television series created by and starring Charlie Engelman. It originally aired on National Geographic Kids for two seasons, and moved to Disney+ for its third and final season.

Inspired by the National Geographic book series of the same name, much of its style and heavy use of paper models created by the Engelmans are continued from their earlier National Geographic short video series Nature Boom Time.

Format 
Using crafting with paper products, the Engelman siblings explore "weird but true" things about a broad-range of subjects, mostly focusing on science. They interview experts and travel to locations such as crime labs, amusement parks, and the Everglades to find answers to their questions and discover weird but true facts, often having their experts share their favorite one. Their other sister Casey appears as a guest star.

Originally, the basement and other scenes set at their house were filmed at Charlie and Kirby's parents' house and basement, in a suburb north of Chicago. For season three, the budget was increased and the basement scenes were filmed at a studio in New Jersey.

The third season was filmed prior to the COVID-19 pandemic. However, several episodes happened to have connections to the experiences children had due to COVID-19, such as the science of germs and how to mitigation spread and infections, as well as experiencing extreme isolation (although in the context of potentially living on Mars). For the third season, Charlie Engelman said that the art production team was "30 to 40 artists", in addition to their research and television production crew.

Episodes

Season 1 (2016–17) 
All episodes were written by Charlie Engelman.

Season 2 (2017–18) 
All episodes were written by Charlie Engelman.

Season 3 (2020)

Reception

Critical response 
The Washington Post praised the humor of the series and described it as a fun and learning experience, saying the show manages to be innovative and informative for its audience, writing, "This humorous and informative tween-oriented show looks at a wide range of topics from a variety of science perspectives. The Emmy-winning series is upbeat and fun, and there’s a lot to be learned from it. It’s a great pick for tweens and grade school-age kids." Surbhi Gupta of The Indian Express said the series has an "engaging mix of art and craft, unbelievable facts, and real-life explorations" and that the show "has grown with each season in terms of scale." Melissa Camacho of Common Sense Media rated the series 4 out of 5 stars, praised its educational value, saying the series invites its audience to deconstruct familiar topics in order to think about them from a different point of view, and complimented the presence of positive messages and role models, stating the series promotes science and innovative thinking through humor, writing, "It's upbeat and fun, and there's a lot to be learned from it, making it a great pick for tweens and up."

Accolades

References

External links 
 
 

2010s American children's television series
2016 American television series debuts
2020s American children's television series
2020 American television series endings
American children's education television series
Disney+ original programming
Emmy Award-winning programs
English-language television shows
Science education television series